Kelsey is a hamlet in central Alberta, Canada within Camrose County.

Kelsey is home to several local businesses, a community hall, and a post office. Both school and fire services are provided by the nearby villages of Rosalind and Bawlf.

History 

In 1902, Mr. and Mrs. Moses Kelsey and their son Earl, arrived in the area from Milbank, South Dakota, and filed on the S.E. 4-45-18. The southeast corner of this quarter of land was later chosen as the site for the community. Milton Zimmerman settled in the area in the same year and suggested the community be named after Kelsey.

In 1915, the Canadian National Railway began laying steel in a south-easterly direction from Camrose. It passed through what a few weeks later became the town of Kelsey. This stretch of railroad is noted for being the longest stretch of straight railway in North America... "if not in the world," some people add.

In 1916, a station house was built in Kelsey and Charlie Cooper, with his wife Anne and family, took up residence in it. The first grain elevator, and two stores were also constructed in the growing town.

By 1920 telephone service had been installed in the Kelsey district and the next few years saw the Kelsey Union Church, a dance hall, and a one room school.

The first power line to reach Kelsey was constructed in 1951.

Demographics 

See also 
List of communities in Alberta
List of designated places in Alberta
List of hamlets in Alberta

References 

Camrose County
Hamlets in Alberta
Designated places in Alberta